Bauhaus Museum may refer to:

 Bauhaus Museum Weimar, Germany
 Bauhaus Museum Dessau, Germany
 Bauhaus Archive, Berlin, Germany
 Bauhaus Foundation Tel Aviv, Israel
 Bauhaus Center Tel Aviv, Israel